Stian Herlofsen Finne-Grønn (31 August 1869 – 1 November 1963) was a  Norwegian lawyer, archivist, genealogist and museum director.

Biography
He was born in the town of Risør  in Aust-Agder, Norway. He was the son of engineer Samuel Grønn (1838–1898) and Jacobine Finne (1845–1912). In October 1900 he married Margrethe Borchgrevink (1873–1963), a daughter of Sofie Borchgrevink. They had the sons Hans Finne-Grønn, a painter, and Jørgen Finne-Grønn, an ambassador.

He attended the Royal Drafting School (Den Kongelige Tegneskole)  in Christiania (now Oslo) graduating examen artium  in 1888. He worked as an assistant architect in Christianssand for several years.   He graduated  cand.jur.   from Det Kongelige Frederiks Universitet (now University of Oslo) in 1899.  He was a secretary in Statistics Norway from 1900 to 1907, then worked in the National Archival Services of Norway from 1907 to 1914. From 1914 to 1939 he worked in the archival services of the city of Oslo. He also had an early involvement with what is today known as Oslo City Museum, which developed from the organization Foreningen Det gamle Christiania in 1905. He became curator of this organization in 1912, and was the director from 1920 to 1949.

His first genealogical work was about lineages in his native Risør, and was published in several volumes between 1895 and 1901.  In 1906 he created the periodical Norsk tidsskrift for genealogi, personalhistorie, biografi og litteraturhistorie, which was Norway's first periodical on genealogy. Editors were Finne-Grønn, Erik Andreas Thomle and Christoffer Morgenstierne Munthe. Norway did not have a national genealogical society, rather there was a Dano-Norwegian organization Samfundet for dansk-norsk Genealogi og Personalhistorie. Finne-Grønn chaired the Norwegian branch from 1919 to 1920. In 1926 Finne-Grønn founded the Norwegian Genealogical Society together with Munthe and Sigurd Segelcke Meidell, among others. He was the first chairman  from 1926 to 1929, and as the organization launched a new periodical Norsk Slektshistorisk Tidsskrift, Finne-Grønn edited it from 1926 to 1936 and from 1947 to his death in 1963.

Finne-Grønn was decorated as a Knight, First Class of the Order of St. Olav in 1945. In 1942 he was created an honorary member of the Norwegian Genealogical Society and the Genealogical Society of Finland. A festschrift  was issued in his honor at the time of his seventy-fifth birthday. He died  in Oslo and was buried at Vestre gravlund.

References

1869 births
1963 deaths
People from Risør
University of Oslo alumni
Writers from Oslo
Architects from Oslo
Norwegian archivists
Norwegian genealogists
Directors of museums in Norway
Recipients of the St. Olav's Medal
Burials at Vestre gravlund